Rafer Ernest Lewis Joseph (born 1968), is a male former athlete who competed for England.

Athletics career
Joseph was the English national champion after winning the 1998 AAA Championships.

He represented England in the decathlon event, at the 1994 Commonwealth Games in Victoria, British Columbia, Canada. Four years later he represented England, at the 1998 Commonwealth Games in Kuala Lumpur, Malaysia.

References

1968 births
English male athletes
Athletes (track and field) at the 1994 Commonwealth Games
Athletes (track and field) at the 1998 Commonwealth Games
Living people
British decathletes
English decathletes
Commonwealth Games competitors for England